Andrew Laties is an American writer and bookseller born in Baltimore, Maryland.

Laties has written for a variety of websites and magazines He also maintains a personal blog.

In 2005 Vox Pop published his IPPY Award-winning book Rebel Bookseller: How To Improvise Your Own Indie Store And Beat Back The Chains. Vox Pop was an independent publisher and a well-known local café in Brooklyn, New York with which Laties was intimately involved. As of September 8, 2010, however, Vox Pop was forced to close its doors.

A second edition entitled Rebel Bookseller: Why Indie Businesses Represent Everything You Want to Fight for—from Free Speech to Buying Local to Building Communities came out in July 2011 from Seven Stories Press.

In addition to his writing, Laties has spoken on the current state of independent publishing. Most recently he presented a lecture titled "Indie Bookstores Still Count: What We Can Do For Publishers, and What Publishers Can Do For Us" at the Digital Book World 2011 conference.

Laties is the founding manager of the Eric Carle Museum Bookshop in Amherst, Massachusetts. Previously, in Chicago, Illinois, Laties co-founded The Children's Bookstore (1985–1996), which received the 1987 WNBA Pannell Award for Excellence in Children's Bookselling. He then created The Children's Museum Store (1994–2002).

Bibliography 
 Rebel Bookseller: Why Indie Businesses Represent Everything You Want To Fight for, from Free Speech To Buying Local To Building Communities (2011)

References 

American booksellers
Writers from Massachusetts
American bloggers
Living people
Year of birth missing (living people)